John Palermo (born March 26, 1952) is an American football coach and former player. He attended Newburgh Free Academy in Newburgh, New York, began his college football career at Wesley College in Delaware before transferring to Florida State. He served as the head football coach at Austin Peay State University in 1990, compiling a record of 0–11.

Head coaching record

References

External links
 Ave Maria profile

1952 births
Living people
Appalachian State Mountaineers football coaches
Austin Peay Governors football coaches
Ave Maria Gyrenes football coaches
Florida State Seminoles football players
Memphis Tigers football coaches
Miami Hurricanes football coaches
Middle Tennessee Blue Raiders football coaches
Minnesota Golden Gophers football coaches
NC State Wolfpack football coaches
Notre Dame Fighting Irish football coaches
Pittsburgh Panthers football coaches
Tennessee Tech Golden Eagles football coaches
Tennessee Volunteers football coaches
Washington Redskins coaches
Wisconsin Badgers football coaches
High school football coaches in Georgia (U.S. state)
Sportspeople from Newburgh, New York
Wesley Wolverines football players
Newburgh Free Academy alumni